G. nuchalis may refer to:

Garrulax nuchalis 
Glareola nuchalis
Gobius nuchalis
Grallaria nuchalis